Chandra Lakshman is an Indian actress. She debuted in the 2002 Tamil film Manasellam and has since then appeared in various Malayalam and Tamil films and TV series. She is probably best known for her performances as Sandra Nellikadan, Rini Chandrasekhar, Ganga and Divya in the TV series Swantham, Megham, Kolangal and Kadhalikka Neramillai, respectively.

Personal life 
She is married to actor Tosh Christy. She gave birth to a Boy in October 2022.

Career 
Chandra Lakshman was born to Lakshman Kumar and Malathi into a brahmin family in Trivandrum. Later family shifted to Chennai, where she also did her schooling and graduation. She had her education from J. N School, Chennai, M.G.R Institute of Hotel Management and Madras University. A trained bharatanatyam dancer, she was doing her hotel management training, when director Santhosh saw her and decided to cast her in his film Manasellam.

She made her acting debut with the 2002 Tamil film Manasellam, enacting the sister character of the film's lead actor Srikanth. Her performance in the film made possible her entry into the Malayalam film industry, landing the lead female role in the action thriller Stop Violence (2002) alongside Prithviraj Sukumaran. Subsequently, she starred in a number of supporting roles in Malayalam-language films like Chakram, Balram vs. Taradas and Khaki.

She shot into limelight through her appearances in TV series. She first appeared in the series Swantham, in which she played Sandra Nellikadan, a villainous character, which was highly appreciated by critics and made her a household name. She then starred in series like Devi, enacting a multi-dimensional character, Stree, playing a homely character and Jwalayayi alongside Nedumudi Venu, playing also a villainous character. For her portrayal of Rini Chandrasekhar in Megham, she also received rave reviews and several awards. In Tamil, she rose to fame after her performance as Ganga, again a character with negative shades, in the famous Kolangal-series, in which she starred alongside Devayani. She is also well known for her performance as Divya and Akhila in the popular series Kadhalikka Neramillai and Vasantham, respectively. She has appeared in some advertisements also. She has won several allocades including Asianet Television Awards for best negative role (2005,2006).

Filmography

Television
 TV series

TV shows

References

External links 
 

Indian television actresses
Indian film actresses
Actresses in Tamil cinema
Actresses in Malayalam cinema
Living people
21st-century Indian actresses
1983 births
Actresses from Chennai
Actresses from Thiruvananthapuram
Actresses in Telugu television
Actresses in Tamil television
Actresses in Malayalam television